Paydirt Pete is the current mascot of the University of Texas at El Paso (UTEP). He is a student dressed as a prospector, reflecting UTEP's nickname of "Miners".

References

  
 

UTEP Miners
Conference USA mascots